Colombo Quotes is a Canadian quiz and panel television series which aired on CBC Television in 1978.

Premise
In the quiz show portion of each episode, secondary school students were to indicate the person who made a given quotation. This was followed by a general discussion of the quotation in question. Episodes were recorded in various Canadian cities.

Scheduling
This half-hour series was broadcast on Sundays at 12:00 noon (Eastern time) from 2 April to 4 June 1978. Each episode was rebroadcast the following Thursday at 4:00 p.m. during this time.

See also
 Fighting Words

References

External links
 

CBC Television original programming
1978 Canadian television series debuts
1978 Canadian television series endings